Charlotte Ryan may refer to:
 Charlotte Ryan (The Unit)
 Charlotte Ryan (broadcaster)